The word "Uchil" is from old Celtic language meaning "the high ground."

In modern usage, the word "Ochil" has replaced the word "Uchil."

See also:
Ochil Hills
Ochil (disambiguation)
Ochil Fault
Ochil (Scottish Parliament constituency)
Uchila (disambiguation), two towns in India
 Uchil is a small  area in kotekar  village in the state of Karnataka near Kerala border